Faris Zubanović (born 12 June 2000) is a Bosnian professional footballer who plays as a forward for Slovenian club Bilje and the Bosnia and Herzegovina U21 national team.

Career statistics

Club

Personal life
Faris is the son of Željezničar club legend Hadis Zubanović.

References

External links
Faris Zubanović at Sofascore

2000 births
Living people
Footballers from Sarajevo
Association football forwards
Bosnia and Herzegovina footballers
FK Željezničar Sarajevo players
Fremad Amager players
FK Velež Mostar players
Premier League of Bosnia and Herzegovina players
Danish 1st Division players
Bosnia and Herzegovina expatriate footballers
Expatriate men's footballers in Denmark
Bosnia and Herzegovina expatriate sportspeople in Denmark